American Biofuels Now is a broad coalition of local biofuels producers, feedstock growers, suppliers, trade groups, environmental organizations, academics and energy users.

Coalition members share the desire for smart, comprehensive policies to support the development of American biofuels to free the country from dependence on foreign oil.

Organization 

America Biofuels Now wants a homegrown solution to reduce America’s dependence on foreign oil. They advocate generally for expansion of biofuels through a market-based approach, letting the market pick the winners and losers.

They recognize that no form of energy production is without its problems. They believe that American ingenuity will overcome challenges and that when compared to the real costs of fossil fuels, will be better for the country and the environment.

They believe American energy can be sustainably grown or recycled from waste into biofuels that can move through existing pipelines or shipped with biofuel-powered engines. Doing so takes advantage of existing infrastructure until new technologies are developed and deployed.

The coalition emphasizes that America’s dependence on foreign fuels risks our national security and economic stability. More simply, an investment in biofuels is an investment in national and energy security.

American Biofuels includes businesses that are directly, indirectly involved or simply concerned about the direction of US energy policy. These businesses understand the local impacts of biofuels development and their part in the bigger picture: to secure American energy independence. Each has publicly identified themselves and their businesses with the issue.

They emphasize the local economic benefits resulting from investing in biofuels production facilities, such as:

•	One 49 MGY Cellulosic ethanol plant will generate about 194 jobs and $105.5 million annually to the local economy in the first phase of operation 

•	A 110 MGY Biodiesel plant will add $117 million to the local economy and create 635 new jobs in all sectors of the economy.

•	Biofuels plants generate millions in tax revenues. Biofuels operations generate additional jobs in the feedstock supply chain, which represents income for farmers, baling operators and transportation.

History 

On April 20, 2010 when the BP’s Deepwater Horizon rig exploded and oil began spilling into the Gulf of Mexico the entire nation watched, transfixed. Around the Gulf coast the issues were both personal and complex: economic, environmental, political and people.

As the oil continued to flow, the public discussion raged about drilling policy, but very little regarding the energy policy pending in Congress.

Still, many trade and business organizations focused their efforts on Washington, D.C. and not on the localized impacts and solutions that reduce the need for further drilling, or putting people to work and creating economic opportunities in rural or under-served communities.

Lost in the noise was the discussion about the growing role of biofuels in energy policy and even more important, the positive local impacts of biofuels production.

While Florida’s Gulf coast did not have much oil obviously wash up on the beaches, the impact was still direct and measurable: oil and tourism don’t mix.

American Biofuels Now grew out of the frustration over the absence of discussions about alternatives and the failure to note that American biofuels have both local and national impacts. American Biofuels Now notes that these energies can be deployed today.

References

External links 

 Americanbiofuelsnow.com official website.

Bioenergy organizations
Oil and Natural Gas Corporation